Dan Cohen is an American journalist and filmmaker based in Washington, D.C. He is the host of Behind the Headlines. Formerly of RT America, Cohen has contributed to Al Jazeera English, Alternet, Electronic Intifada, The Grayzone, Middle East Eye, Mondoweiss, The Nation, and Vice News. Cohen is from Phoenix, Arizona  and has one child.

Cohen is Jewish and his family were Lithuanian Jews from Lazdijai, Lithuania who were exterminated by the Nazis during the Holocaust, and the occupation of Lithuania following Operation Barbarossa.

Works
Killing Gaza (2018), with Max Blumenthal

References

Living people
American columnists
American documentary filmmakers
American investigative journalists
American political writers
American male writers
Writers on the Middle East
Year of birth missing (living people)
21st-century American non-fiction writers
21st-century American male writers